Dumkal Polytechnic, established in 2002,  is a self-financed polytechnic located in Dumkal, Murshidabad district, West Bengal, India. This polytechnic is approved by AICTE and affiliated to the West Bengal State Council of Technical Education, AICTE is allowed  This polytechnic offers diploma courses in Electrical, Computer Science & Technology, Mechanical and Civil Engineering.

References

External links
http://www.dumkalpolytechnic.in
http://www.b-e-s.net/dp/index.php

Universities and colleges in Murshidabad district
Educational institutions established in 2002
2002 establishments in West Bengal
Technical universities and colleges in West Bengal